Paul Ian Walter (born 28 May 1994) who plays for Essex County Cricket Club. Paul is a left-handed all-rounder who bowls left-arm medium-fast. He made his Twenty20 debut for Essex, on 24 June 2016, against Hampshire. He made his List A debut for Essex in the 2017 Royal London One-Day Cup on 10 May 2017.

Originally taking his place in the Essex team mostly as bowler, and batting at number 10 on his first-class debut, Walter later was picked as a number three batsman and even as an opener in limited-overs cricket. In the 2021 season he found a regular place in the middle-order for Essex in the County Championship, being notable for his consistency. He maintains an average of around 40. On the other hand his bowling was rarely used.

He started the 2022 season in the second XI with new signing Matt Critchley taking his spot in the middle order. Returning to the first team after injury to Dan Lawrence, he made 93 against Northants to help save the match and secure his place in the side. In May 2022, in the 2022 County Championship, Walter scored his maiden century in first-class cricket, with 141 against Yorkshire.

References

External links
 
 

1994 births
English cricketers
Essex cricketers
Living people
North v South cricketers
Manchester Originals cricketers
Sportspeople from Basildon